The Singapore Fed Cup team represents Singapore in Fed Cup tennis competition and are governed by the Singapore Tennis Association. They currently compete in the Group II Asia/Oceania Zone.

History
Singapore competed in its first Fed Cup in 1989. Their best result was 9th in Asia/Oceania Group I in 2007.

Players

See also
Fed Cup
Singapore Davis Cup team

External links

Billie Jean King Cup teams
Fed Cup
Fed Cup